David Shatraw (born June 7, 1962) is an American film, television, stage and voice actor. Probably his best known roles to date are those of Tom Cole in the Netflix series Cobra Kai and Tommy Shafter in the TV comedy series Titus (2000–2002).

He has made guest appearances in TV series including Cold Case, The West Wing, Six Feet Under, Oliver Beene, and Liv and Maddie and has appeared in movies such as Live From Baghdad and In Her Shoes.

He has also done a great deal of voice-over work in video games and animated TV shows, and he has appeared in a number of stage plays including Teenage Mutant Ninja Turtles: Coming Out of Their Shells Tour where he played Michelangelo.

He has a BFA from Hofstra University, and an MFA from the Asolo Conservatory for Actor Training.

Filmography

Film
 Killer Diller (2004) - Reporter
 One More Round (2005) - Randal
 In Her Shoes (2005) - The Professor's Grandson
 Pope Dreams (2006) - Joel Rossman
 Mini's First Time (2006) - Husband #1
 A Country Christmas (2013) - Anderson Hemmer
 3's a Couple (2014) - Mr. Johnson
 Senior Moment (2021) - Officer Matthews

Television

Video
 Teenage Mutant Ninja Turtles: Coming Out of Their Shells Tour (Video 1990) - Michelangelo

Videogames

External links

 David Shatraw Fan Website

1962 births
American male actors
Living people
Actors from Albany, New York
Hofstra University alumni